Sometimes I Feel Like Cryin' is an album by American folk singer Odetta, released in 1962. It was her first release for RCA Victor.

Track listing 
All tracks composed by Odetta; except where noted.
"Gonna Take My Time"
"Stranger Here"
"I've Been Living with the Blues" (Brownie McGhee)
"Be My Woman"
"Poor Man"
"Empty Pocket Blues" (Lee Hays, Pete Seeger)
"I Just Can't Keep from Cryin'"
"Special Delivery"
"If I Had Wings" (Traditional)
"Darlin' Baby"
"Misery Blues"
"House of the Rising Sun" (Traditional)

Personnel 
Odetta – vocals, guitar
Ahmed Abdul-Malik, Leonard Gaskin – bass
Dick Wellstood – piano
Panama Francis – drums
Buster Bailey – clarinet
Vic Dickenson – trombone
Buck Clayton – trumpet

References 

1963 albums
Odetta albums
Albums produced by George Avakian
RCA Records albums